Johan Eklund (born 30 May 1984) is a Swedish footballer who plays for IK Brage as a forward.

Career
Eklund grew up in Falun where he started out playing for hometown club Falu BS which later turned into Falu FK. In his youth he was also a Team handball and Floorball player before deciding to invest all his time into football at age 15 or 16. In 2008, he was signed by IK Brage to play as a defensive midfielder but was soon moved back into his natural forward position. There he had an extremely successful year in 2009 where he scored 21 goals in 23 games and helped his team win promotion to second tier Superettan. The following year he also became a top ten goalscorer of the 2010 Superettan.

Career statistics

References

External links

1984 births
Living people
Association football forwards
GIF Sundsvall players
IK Brage players
Allsvenskan players
Superettan players
Swedish footballers
People from Falun
Sportspeople from Dalarna County